is a train station in Miyoshi, Hiroshima Prefecture, Japan.

Lines
West Japan Railway Company
Fukuen Line

Railway stations in Hiroshima Prefecture
Railway stations in Japan opened in 1935